Epicrates is a genus of non-venomous snakes in the subfamily Boinae of the family Boidae. The genus is native to South America and Central America. Five species are currently recognized as being valid, including the rainbow boa.

Distribution and habitat
Species of Epicrates are found in lower Central America through South America as far south as Argentina.

Species

) Not including the nominate subspecies.
T) Type species.

Etymology
The specific name, alvarezi, is in honor of Argentine herpetologist Antenor Álvarez (1864–1948).

The specific name, assisi, is in honor of Arlindo de Assis who collected the holotype.

References

External links

 

 
Reptiles of Central America
Reptiles of South America
Snake genera
Taxa named by Johann Georg Wagler